Cosmopterosis hispida is a moth in the family Crambidae. It was described by Maria Alma Solis in 2009. It is found in Brazil (Rio de Janeiro).

The apical two thirds of the forewings is rufous, while the costa and basal one fourth are creamy to yellowish white with brown-tipped scales. There is a rufous spot in the area between the subbasal and medial lines on the hindwings. The postmedial and subterminal lines consist of brown-tipped scales.

Etymology
The species name refers to the brushlike lateral projections forming the sclerotized dorsal extension from the base of the juxta and is derived from Latin hispidus (meaning bristly).

References

Glaphyriinae
Moths described in 2009